Marianne Yvonne Heemskerk (born 28 August 1944 in Rotterdam, South Holland) is a former butterfly swimmer from the Netherlands, who won the silver medal in the 100 m butterfly at the 1960 Summer Olympics in Rome, Italy. She was also part of the 4 × 100 m medley relay team that finished fourth. She also participated in the 1964 Summer Olympics but did not reach the finals. Heemskerk broke the world record in the women's 200m butterfly on 12 June 1960 in Leipzig, East Germany.

References

1944 births
Living people
Olympic swimmers of the Netherlands
Dutch female butterfly swimmers
Swimmers at the 1960 Summer Olympics
Swimmers at the 1964 Summer Olympics
Olympic silver medalists for the Netherlands
Swimmers from Rotterdam
World record setters in swimming
European Aquatics Championships medalists in swimming
Medalists at the 1960 Summer Olympics
Olympic silver medalists in swimming
20th-century Dutch women